Green pig may refer to:
Fluorescent green pig, a transgenic pig expressing green fluorescent protein
The targets in the Angry Birds video game and franchise
A character in The Little Green Pig, a story within the play The Pillowman
A rath in the nonsense poem Jabberwocky
Magically created pigs in Disney Princess Enchanted Tales: Follow Your Dreams
A character in the Malazan Book of the Fallen
A minor character in the manga series Tonde Burin
Hawk's mother in The Seven Deadly Sins manga series
The cover of À la Carte, an album by Erste Allgemeine Verunsicherung

See also
Green pig-face, a flower
Last One Home is a Green Pig, a children's book by Edith Thacher Hurd